Jean-Pierre Cave (20 February 1952 – 28 March 2017) was a French politician. He served as a member of the National Assembly from 1993 to 1997, representing Tarn-et-Garonne.

References

1952 births
2017 deaths
People from Montauban
Politicians from Occitania (administrative region)
Union for French Democracy politicians
Deputies of the 10th National Assembly of the French Fifth Republic